The Pink Friday Tour is the debut concert tour by Trinidadian singer/songwriter Nicki Minaj in support of her first two studio albums, Pink Friday 
(2010) and Pink Friday: Roman Reloaded (2012). The tour began in May 2012 with shows in Australia and Asia. The tour then continued on to Europe and North America in June, July, and August 2012. The tour came to a close on August 14, 2012, in New York City at the Roseland Ballroom. The final show was a part of a free Pepsi promotional concert. Attendees were only eligible for tickets if they called radio stations Hot 97, Power 105, Z-100, 92.3 Now, and WBLI or tweet Nicki Minaj or Pepsi on Twitter. After playing 41 shows on 4 continents, Minaj quickly followed up the tour with the Pink Friday: Reloaded Tour.

Background and development
While promoting her second album in the UK, Minaj revealed tour dates for major cities in England. The singer officially announced the tour via Twitter on May 1, 2012—showcasing the stage resembling Barbie Dreamhouse. Minaj stated that she will play radio and outdoor festivals in conduction with arenas and theatres. She also mentions the tour will have an "intimate yet big" feel. Laurieann Gibson will serve as creative director and choreographer for the tour. Gibson stated "Nicki Minaj was so much fun for me, and it was like a real breath of fresh air, and musically, to get back to the rap game, to see a female MC dominate the pop charts, this, historically, for me, I feel a bit of responsibility", in a MTV interview.

Concert synopsis
The concert is divided into five acts, they all incorporate Minaj's hip-hop, pop, rap, and R&B styles of music. An interlude kicks-off the show with Minaj's voice explaining that her alter ego "Roman", warrior of "Pinkslam", must travel for 40 days, and 40 nights, to planet Earth to defeat an evil force known as "Nemesis". Minaj begins the concert in a black cloak, singing the fiery-bar spitting song "Roman's Revenge" or the fast-paced "Roman Holiday" while standing on top of the stage with a church themed backdrop. The dancers are also dressed in black cloaks. After the first chorus, Minaj takes off the cloak and reveals a new outfit which consists of pink and black polka dot high rise panties, and a yellow and black polka dot jacket, or a graffiti themed jacket, paired with leggings underneath. The dancers also appear in different attire after their cloaks are removed. She then burst out into her hip-hop segment starting off with "Did it on 'Em" followed by her verses in "I Am Your Leader" continued with "Beez in the Trap" and then on to a snippet of "Stupid Hoe" before rolling into her verse in Big Sean's "Dance (A$$)".

After a brief pause Minaj continues the show with a new segment starting with "Right by My Side" that flows into "Champion" and concludes the segment with "Moment 4 Life" while wearing the same attire as last segment. The medley's backdrop consisted of a sky themed backdrop. After finishing the medley Minaj heads backstage to change outfits while the DJ plays an interlude leading up to the next segment.

After the interlude ends Minaj returns to the stage wearing a white vest, white leggings, and a white tutu accompanied with white high heels. Minaj's dancers have also changed into gold attire. Minaj then takes a splatter-painted gun and sprays the crowd with white fog. After Minaj sets the gun down she returns to her group of female dancers before jumping into "Starships" which starts the pop segment of the concert. To go along with "Starships" the backdrop was inside of a "Starship". After "Starships", she then sings "Pound the Alarm". Next, Minaj walks around the stage slapping her dancer's butts before heading into "Whip It". Minaj then dives into her verses in David Guetta's dance anthem "Where Them Girls At". Then Minaj performs "Turn Me On". Minaj then walks off stage for a second time for another outfit change.

At the end of the interlude Nicki emerges from backstage with a pink dress on and also changed her wig to a short blond wig with pink accents. She then talks about how she got her heart broken and wanted to literally kill someone. She followed that statement with saying "But instead I wrote a song." which lead into "Fire Burns" with an Autumn themed background. She followed the song by then performing "Save Me" with Barbie's house as a backdrop. After "Save Me" she left the stage which ended her softer, more emotional segment of the show. Another DJ interlude played while she made her final costume change of the concert.

For the last segment Minaj is dressed with graffiti leggings, a striped shirt, black panties, with a pink hat and some necklaces. She had also changed her wig to solid black with bangs. The background for this segment is a basic speaker system. She then performs a mixtape medley which consisted of songs such as "Go Hard", "Sweet Dreams", "Slumber Party", "Beam Me Up Scotty", "Freaky Gurl", "I Get Crazy", and "Itty Bitty Piggy" from her mixtapes. In the European leg of the tour Minaj also performed "Itty Bitty Piggy" in the medley. Minaj then performs "Come On A Cone" before the final medley. The final medley consisted of songs such as "Up All Night", "Make Me Proud", "My Chick Bad", "Bottoms Up", "Monster", "Letting Go (Dutty Love)", "Hold Yuh", "BedRock", "Roman Reloaded", and "Roman in Moscow". Following the final medley Minaj states "Is there a song you haven't heard yet?", which leads right into "Super Bass". Minaj finishes "Super Bass" at the top of the stage with white fog shooting in the air along each staircase before saying "Thank you and goodnight!" which leads to an encore chorus before Nicki and her dancers exit the stage.

Critical response

The tour received generally positive reviews from music critics. Kicking off the tour in Australia, music critics gave the performances extremely positive reviews. Kathy McCabe (The Daily Telegraph) writes that Minaj was "colorful" during the tour's debut at the Horden Pavilion. She continues, "Minaj graciously brought her arena show to town with its awesome backdrop of videos, those ripped dancers, a song list of hits, her graciousness and potty mouth, and smashed it all together into a one-hour show.  A lot of smoke and mirrors but all of it rather delectable. Except for the poor mums". Hannah Kimber (news.com.au) states Minaj's show in Sydney was an array of "deep beats, technicolour lighting and Disney inspired ensembles". She further states, "It was a night of tiny tasty Nicki treats all mashed into a mini musical feast with tight choreography and lots to look at. But 65 minutes was not long enough for a full Nicki fix and the rabid Barbz in Sydney craved more Minaj". At the Hisense Arena, Tran Nguyen (Take 40 Australia) humorously gave the show eight out of ten weaves. He says, "it was her performance of "Starships" that drove the fans completely wild. The ground shook harder, and more arms were flailing about (and blocking my view—although, my lack of height may have something to with that). Fans were jumping up and down, and occasionally busting a move or two". The concert at the Brisbane Entertainment Centre was given two and a half out of five stars by Bridie Jabour (Brisbane Times). She says, ""Nicki did the obligatory good night and I love you and left the stage. And then something happened that I have not witnessed at the Brisbane Entertainment Centre or even the Tivoli. Everyone just left. There were no screams for an encore, no chanting of her name, no pleading for her to return and do just one more song. Nicki had finished her show and her fans were more than ready for it to be finished".

Alexis Petridis from The Guardian attended the show at the HMV Hammersmith Apollo in London, he gave the Pink Friday Tour an average score with 3 out of 5 stars, saying "It seems a strange thing to say about a performance that opens with a woman rapping "I'm a bad bitch, I'm a cunt", but there's something oddly restrained about Nicki Minaj's live show. Then Petridis later commented on how moderate the show was in comparison to her exorcism-themed performance at the 54th Grammy Awards, "Given this is a woman who staged a mock exorcism on stage at the Grammys, before being hoisted into the air on wires while singing O Come All Ye Faithful, it's a relatively stripped-down show, which cleaves more to hip-hop tradition than pop extravaganza. There are costume changes and a confetti cannon, but there's no band, just a small troupe of dancers, a DJ and a hype man". Jon Carmanica of the NY Times, gave the tour a positive review speaking on her ability to reach pop and hip-hop audiences, "Unlike almost any other rapper, she manages to exist on pop radio and hip-hop radio simultaneously (generally with different songs), and she's equally comfortable in both spaces."

Opening acts

Stooshe (UK)
Timomatic (Melbourne, Sydney)
Stan Walker (Brisbane)
2 Chainz (North America)
 Baby K (Italy)
Mr Polska (Netherlands)

Setlist

Tour dates

Notes

This concert is part of Wired 96.5 Fest.

This concert is part of Radio 1's Hackney Weekend.

This concert is a part of the Barclaycard Wireless Festival.

This concert is a part of T in the Park.

This concert is a part of a free, Pepsi promotional concert, Attendees were only eligible for a chance to win tickets if you called on radio stations Hot 97, Power 105, Z-100, 92.3 Now, and WBLI or tweet Nicki Minaj or Pepsi on Twitter.

Cancellations and rescheduled shows

Box office score data

Notes
"Slumber Party" was introduced to the setlist in Cleveland on July 19, 2012.
Nicki Minaj performed "Roman in Moscow" for the first time in Washington, D.C. on July 21, 2012.
On July 22, 2012, in Atlanta at the Fox Theatre, many surprise guests came out to perform alongside Minaj, including Young Jeezy, Monica, Bobby Valentino, Waka Flocka Flame, T.I, and Lil Scrappy.
On July 24, 2012, in Miami, Lil Wayne, Birdman, and DJ Khaled were brought out to perform. Celebrity Angela Simmons was in attendance at this concert.
On July 27, 2012, in New Orleans, Birdman presented Minaj with a Platinum plaque for her second studio album Pink Friday: Roman Reloaded.
Rappers Bun B, Slim Thug, and Paul Wall were guests at Minaj's show in Houston on July 28, 2012.
On August 8, 2012, in Los Angeles Tyga and Sean Kingston came out as surprise performers, also Natasha Bedingfield was in attendance at this concert.
On August 14, 2012, in New York City,  at Roseland Ballroom, Cam'ron, Foxy Brown, Drake, and Lil Wayne were brought out as surprise performers. This show was streamed live by Pepsi, and broadcast in Times Square. Celebrities Busta Rhymes and Russell Simmons were in attendance.

References

External links
 Minaj's Official website

2012 concert tours
Nicki Minaj concert tours